Boarmia ceylonaria is a moth of the family Geometridae first described by John Nietner in 1861.

References

Moths of Asia
Moths described in 1861